Actors Federal Credit Union (ActorsFCU) is an American federally chartered credit union—a cooperatively run, not-for-profit financial institution, owned and controlled by its members. Based in New York City, New York, ActorsFCU is regulated and insured by the National Credit Union Administration (NCUA), an agency of the U.S. Federal Government comparable to the Federal Deposit Insurance Corporation. It is the 49th largest credit union in the state of New York and the 993rd largest credit union in the nation. It has an overall health score at DepositAccounts.com of a B, with a B+ Texas ratio.
Currently led by Daniel Czerniawski, ActorsFCU serves over 22,000 members of more than 190 organizations nationwide with assets of more than $180,000,000. ActorsFCU has 44 full-time employees and 4 part-time employees with a main office and 4 branch offices.

History
ActorsFCU was incorporated on December 5, 1962. Its initial purpose was to facilitate members of Actors’ Equity Association (AEA) in their pursuit of getting approved for credit. Due to their unpredictable finances and lack of traditionally defined steady employment, actors had regularly been denied this basic, modern necessity.
The specific impetus behind the 1962 movement was an incident at a local department store: an AEA member was denied credit specifically due to the fact that he was an actor. This member proceeded to raise the issue at a union meeting and enlisted six men to take up the challenge of starting a credit union for those in the acting profession. These men—Conrad Bain, Anthony Saverino, Robin Craven, Herb Nelson, Theodore Bikel, Angus Duncan, and Bill Ross—formed the Actors Federal Credit Union in 1962 with the help of Leo Schwarz, Field Representative of the New York League of Credit Unions.

In the late 1960s, the credit union issued its first mortgage to actor Jerry Orbach.
1979:  Angela Lansbury was welcomed as the ten-thousandth member
1986: merged with Local 700 Motion Picture Editors Guild Credit Union
In the late 1980s: merged with Writers Guild of America, East Credit Union
1991: merged with American Federation of Television and Radio Artists(AFTRA) Credit Union
1998: helped get the Credit Union Membership Access Act (HR-1151) enacted
1999: placed its first ATM and became NYC's number one credit union deployer of ATMs.

In 2002, NYC Council Speaker Gifford Miller and Third District Council member Christine Quinn along with Torrence Allen, delivered proclamations of congratulations to the ActorsFCU. Letters were also presented from New York State Senator Tom Duane and U.S. Senator Hillary Clinton. Public Advocate Betsy Gotbaum issued a proclamation declaring May 7 "Actors Federal Credit Union Day" in New York City, in perpetuity.

Organization
Actors Federal is chartered by the NCUA  and governed by a board of volunteers, elected by and from its membership. The Credit Committee, which oversees the issuance of loans to the membership, is also composed of volunteers elected by the membership. Members are encouraged to serve on committees, run for office, and vote at the annual meeting.

Services
ActorsFCU offers a range of account services generally offered by typical financial institutions such as credit cards and consumer loans (including balance transfer, cash advances, computer, union initiation fee, income tax, personal, vacation, and share secured), as well as auto loans and musical instrument loans. It has exempt status conferred by the state to engage in the business of mortgage loan servicing in New York without being registered as a mortgage loan servicer.

Currently, ActorsFCU has five branch offices—two in New York City, including the main office in Times Square, one in Los Angeles, one in North Hollywood and one in Chicago.

ActorsFCU owns and operates 270 ATMs in NYC’s five boroughs, Long Island, and New Jersey and is part of CO-OP Network.

Actors Federal is among the few institutions that offer Coogan Trust (SB 1162; CA) and UTMA/UGMA Accounts, designed to protect the earnings of child performers. By law, fifteen per cent of a young performer’s gross earnings must be saved in these accounts, which are locked and are not available for withdrawal until the minor reaches the age of 18.

Membership
Actors Federal’s field of membership is designated by the National Credit Union Administration (NCUA). Membership is limited to individuals who share the common bond defined in the credit union’s charter. Members and employees of specified organizations and their immediate family members are eligible to join ActorsFCU. The definition of “Immediate family members” includes, but is not limited to: spouse/significant other, children, grandchildren, siblings, parents, and grandparents. Any individual who joins the credit union as a family member is entitled to the same membership benefits available to the sponsoring member.

Membership in Actors FCU is limited to members of the following organizations:

References

Credit unions based in New York (state)
Banks established in 1962
Financial services companies based in New York City
Actors' Equity Association
1962 establishments in New York City
American companies established in 1962